"Too Good" is a song by Canadian rapper Drake, featuring Barbadian singer Rihanna, released in the United Kingdom on May 15, 2016, as the fourth single from his fourth studio album Views (2016), before later being serviced to US contemporary hit radio on July 26, 2016, as the fifth and final single from the album. It samples the dancehall song "Love Yuh Bad" performed by Popcaan. The song was co-written by Drake and Rihanna alongside Andrew Hershey, Andre Sutherland, Atom Martin, and the track's producers Nineteen85, Maneesh Bidaye, and Dwayne Chin-Quee.

"Too Good" was a commercial success, reaching number 9 in Canada, number 3 in the UK, and number 14 on the US Billboard Hot 100. Following "One Dance" and "Controlla", "Too Good" was the third dancehall single to be released from Views.

Composition
"Too Good" is written in the key of G Lydian and has a tempo of 118 beats per minute.  The vocals in the song span from A3 to D5 with the song moving in common time.

Production
"Too Good" came into fruition after both Drake and Rihanna recorded her 2016 single "Work", Drake recalled stating "I was like, I think I have one that would follow this one up really nicely. She got in the studio and just bodied it. It was like a flawless victory when she sent it back ... We have a genuine energy between us." "Too Good" was written by Drake, Paul Jefferies, Rihanna, Maneesh Bidaye, Diego Sanchez, Dwayne Chin-Quee, Andrew Hershey, Andre Sutherland, Atom Martin and Terence Lam, and produced by Nineteen85 and Supa Dups. In addition to Drake's lead vocals, the track features a guest appearance from Rihanna and contains vocal and lyrical samples of "Love Yuh Bad" performed by Popcaan. It is the fourth collaboration between Drake and Rihanna after "What's My Name?", "Take Care" and "Work".

Critical reception
Matthew Ramirez of Pitchfork Media named the song "The Best New Track" of the day and "Too Good" a highlight from Views. Ramirez stated, ""Too Good" is a vestige of the same creative juices that flowed through "Work"s Caribbean-inspired polyrhythm. (A similar influence is all over Views.) Drake clumsily interprets a Popcaan song that nineteen85 (of dvsn) ends up sampling anyway, but give him some credit for embracing his fake patois. This is one of a few songs on Views that benefits from his unabashed shamelessness in the same way that texting someone at 4 a.m. and claiming you did it on accident is shameless. ("I wanna benefit from the friendship/I wanna get the late night message" is the Drake-iest moment here.) People always feel unappreciated and overworked in their relationships, and here Drake and Rihanna nail that dynamic as only they can—mixing blunt neediness with lust."

Ed Masley of AZCentral said it revisited "the Caribbean dancehall rhythms" of Rihanna's “Work", and going on to note that Drake "and his greatest female duet partner trade off verses in a richly detailed he-said/she-said portrait of what may be going through the other person's head while you're busy convincing yourself that you're the only person putting any effort into this relationship."

Billboard ranked "Too Good" at number 32 on their "100 Best Pop Songs of 2016" list: “Drake hit the jackpot with the dancehall sound of "One Dance," but the addition of Caribbean queen Rihanna on this dueling duet takes his island vibe to the next level. Don't be fooled by the Views track's sunny beat, though: These two should really break up, if they know what's good for them.”

Charts

Weekly charts

Year-end charts

Certifications

Release history

References

2015 songs
2016 singles
Drake (musician) songs
Rihanna songs
Song recordings produced by Nineteen85
Dancehall songs
Songs written by Drake (musician)
Songs written by Rihanna
Songs written by Nineteen85
Songs written by Supa Dups